Cambridge City Historic District is a national historic district located at Cambridge City, Wayne County, Indiana. The district encompasses 572 contributing buildings and 2 contributing structures in the central business district and surrounding residential sections of Cambridge City. It developed between about 1838 and 1939 and includes representative examples of Greek Revival, Italianate, and Federal style architecture. Located in the district are the separately listed Conklin-Montgomery House and Lackey-Overbeck House.  Other notable contributing buildings include the Vinton House (1849), Opera House (1876), Western Wayne Bank (c. 1884), Grand Theater (c. 1880), Knights of Pythias Building (1899), Public Library (1936), U.S. Post Office (1940), City Building (1901), Crum-Swiggett House (c. 1840), Old Bertsch Foundry (1853), Presbyterian Church (1858), St. Elizabeth's Roman Catholic Church (1880), and Central School (1935).

The district was added to the National Register of Historic Places in 1991.

References

Historic districts on the National Register of Historic Places in Indiana
Italianate architecture in Indiana
Greek Revival architecture in Indiana
Federal architecture in Indiana
Historic districts in Wayne County, Indiana
National Register of Historic Places in Wayne County, Indiana